A by-election was held for the New South Wales Legislative Assembly electorate of Patrick's Plains on 8 February 1866 because Bowie Wilson had been appointed Secretary for Lands in the second Martin ministry. Such ministerial by-elections were usually uncontested however on this occasion a poll was required in Patrick's Plains and Yass Plains (Robert Isaacs). Both ministers were comfortably re-elected with more than 70% of the vote. The other ministers James Martin (The Lachlan), Henry Parkes (Kiama), James Byrnes (Parramatta) and Geoffrey Eagar (West Sydney) were re-elected unopposed.

Mr E E Darvall was a bank clerk, the son of John Darvall, the former attorney general. This was the only occasion on which he stood for parliament.

John Heuston was a burlesque candidate, apparently winning a £10 bet for nominating, but withdrew before the poll.

Dates

Polling places

Result

Bowie Wilson was appointed Secretary for Lands in the second Martin ministry.

See also
 Electoral results for the district of Patrick's Plains
List of New South Wales state by-elections

References

1866 elections in Australia
New South Wales state by-elections
1860s in New South Wales